The Darien Gap: Travels in the Rainforest of Panama is a non-fiction book, written by Canadian writer Martin Mitchinson, first published in August 2008 by Harbour Publishing. In the book, the author chronicles his 18-month expedition traveling the province of the Darién Gap, an area dangerous for human sojourns; a haven for Colombian guerrillas and drug-trafficking. The jungle is dense and teeming with caimans, boa constrictors, and jaguars. Mitchinson sailed into the province aboard his 36-foot ketch. He then moved in with a native family who also served as his guide.

Awards and honours
The Darien Gap received shortlist recognition for the 2009 "Edna Staebler Award for Creative Non-Fiction".

See also
List of Edna Staebler Award recipients

References

External links
November 23, 2009, The Darien Gap, Some Travel Advice for Visitors to Panama's Darien Gap. A Long Answer, Retrieved November 23, 2012

Canadian non-fiction books
2008 non-fiction books